Anaïs, Anaís, or Anais is a female given name. It is widely thought to be a French Provençal and Catalan version of Anna. Some suggest it is derived from Anahita, the name of the Persian goddess of fertility and healing.

Since about 1980, the name Anaïs has been especially popular in France, perhaps due to the popularity of the Cacharel perfume "Anaïs Anaïs".  There is no account of the name in France before the late eighteenth century, when it is traceable in Provence and Catalonia.  The diminutive form Naïs was the title of a film by Marcel Pagnol.

People with the given name

In literature
 Anaïs Nin (writer) (1903-1977), real name Angela Anaïs Juana Antolina Rosa Edelmira Nin y Culmell, a French-Cuban-American diarist, essayist, novelist and writer of short stories and erotica
 Marjorie Anaïs Housepian Dobkin, Armenian-American writer and professor

In music
 Anaïs (singer) (born 1965), real name Régine Hantelle, a French female singer, also part of duo Alice et Anaïs and the duo Anaïs et Didier Barbelivien
 Anaís (born 1984), Dominican Latin pop singer, winner of the second season of Objetivo Fama
 Anaïs Lameche (born 1987), Swedish singer
 Anaïs Mitchell (born 1981), American singer-songwriter and musician
 Anaïs Perrière-Pilte (1836–1878), French composer
 Anaís Vivas (born 1989), Venezuelan singer

In film and theater
 Anaís (actress) (born 1974), Mexican actress
 Anaïs Aubert, known as Mademoiselle Anaïs (1802–1871), French actress
 Anaïs Barbeau-Lavalette (born 1979), Canadian actress, film director, and screenwriter
 Anaïs Delva (born 1986), French singer and actress
 Anaïs Demoustier (born 1987), French actress
 Anaïs Fargueil (1819–1896), French actress
 Anais Granofsky (born 1973), Canadian actress, screenwriter, producer and director
 Anaïs Perrière-Pilte (1809–1878), French composer

In fashion
 Anais Catala, Iraqi-French model
 Anais Mali (born 1991), French model
 Anais Pouliot (born 1991), Canadian model
 Anaïs Veerapatren (born 1986), Mauritian beauty pageant

In sports
 Anaïs Bescond (born 1987), French biathlete
 Anaïs Caradeux (born 1990), French skier
 Anaïs Chevalier (born 1993), French biathlete
 Anais García Balmaña (born 1980), Spanish Paralympic swimmer
 Anaïs Lagougine (born 1988), French rugby union player
 Anaïs Laurendon (born 1985), French tennis player
 Anaïs Michel (born 1988), French weightlifter
 Anaïs Morand (born 1993), Swiss figure skater
 Anaïs Laurendon (born 1985), French tennis player
 Anais Oyembo (born 1980), Gabonese sprinter
 Anaïs Ventard (born 1996), French figure skater

In other fields
 Anaïs Baydemir (born 1979), French-Turkish journalist and weather presenter
 Anaïs Napoleón (1831–1912), French-Spanish photographer
 Anaïs Toudouze (1822–1899), French artist and fashion illustrator

Fictional characters 
 Madame Anaïs, brothel-keeper in the 1928 novel Belle de Jour and the 1967 film of the same name
 Anaïs, portrayed by Anaïs Reboux in the film À ma sœur! (2001)
 Anais Watterson, in the animated series The Amazing World of Gumball
 Anais, the Latin American dub name for Fuu of Magic Knight Rayearth
 Anais, Mopsmadam (Auriau)
Saint Anais, Living Saint of Sisters of Battle Order of the Sacred Rose, in Warhammer 40,000: Dawn of War Soulstorm video game
Anais, illegitimate daughter of king Foltest in The Witcher 2: Assassins of Kings video game
Anais Adler, portrayed by Eve O'Brien in Law & Order: Special Victims Unit (season 21, episode 8).
Anais Barnes-Gaines, the daughter of Sheryll Barnes and Charlotte Gaines on FBI: Most Wanted

Wildlife
Colibri d'Anaïs, also known as sparkling violetear (Colibri coruscans) is a species of hummingbird

See also 

 Anaïs (disambiguation)

References

Feminine given names
French feminine given names